Isabel Checa Porcel (born December 27, 1982 in Silla, Valencia) is a Spanish long-distance runner. Checa represented Spain at the 2008 Summer Olympics in Beijing, where she competed for the women's 10,000 metres. She finished the race in twenty-ninth place by fourteen seconds behind China's Dong Xiaoqin, with a time of 33:17.88.

Checa is the twin sister of long-distance runner Dolores Checa, who also competed for the women's 5000 metres at the 2008 Summer Olympics.

References

External links

NBC 2008 Olympics profile

1982 births
Living people
Spanish female long-distance runners
Olympic athletes of Spain
Athletes (track and field) at the 2008 Summer Olympics
People from Valencia